Cleotrivia colettae is a species of small sea snail, a marine gastropod mollusk in the family Triviidae, the false cowries or trivias.

Description
The shell grows to a length of 3.8 mm

Distribution
This species is distributed in the Red Sea, the Persian Gulf and in the Indian Ocean along Réunion

References

 Fehse D. (1999). Studies on Ovulidae and Triviidae of Mozambique and Réunion. La Conchiglia 31(292): 47-55, 63 
 Fehse D. (2002) Beiträge zur Kenntnis der Triviidae (Mollusca: Gastropoda) V. Kritische Beurteilung der Genera und Beschreibung einer neuen Art der Gattung Semitrivia Cossmann, 1903. Acta Conchyliorum 6: 3-48. page(s): 26
 ehse D. & Grego J. (2009) Contributions to the knowledge of the Triviidae (Mollusca: Gastropoda). X. The Triviidae from the Red Sea with a description of a new genus Purpurcapsula and a new species in the genus Trivirostra Jousseaume, 1884. Visaya 2(5): 18-79, pls. 1-13. page(s): 39

External links
 

Triviidae
Gastropods described in 1999